Últimas voluntades is an upcoming Spanish thriller drama film directed by Joaquín Carmona Hidalgo which stars Óscar Casas, Fernando Tejero, Nerea Camacho, Adriana Ozores, and Carlos Santos.

Plot 
The plot concerns a father (Coque) trying to win back forgiveness from his son (Andrés) after leaving prison. Coque abandoned Andrés when the latter was a toddler.

Cast

Production 
The screenplay was penned by Salvador Serrano (also featuring as a cast member) and Helio Mira. The film was produced by Biopic Films and Maskeline, a Visual Foundry alongside La Charito Films, with the participation of RTVE and 7 Televisión Región de Murcia. Shooting began in December 2021, but production was halted on 19 December due to a localised COVID-19 outbreak which affected several crew members. Once resumed in 2022, some characters were recast due to schedule obligations of the original cast, and thus Àlex Monner,  and Alberto San Juan were replaced by Óscar Casas, Adriana Ozores and Carlos Santos. Shooting re-started from scratch after the hiatus. It was shot in the Region of Murcia, including locations such as  Murcia, Molina de Segura, Cartagena, Calasparra, Fuente Álamo, and Cehegín (Valentín).

Release 
Upon the wrap of shooting, the film's theatrical release was tentatively expected for late 2022.

See also 
 List of Spanish films of 2022

References 

Upcoming films
Films shot in the Region of Murcia
Spanish thriller drama films
Upcoming Spanish-language films